The 1988 Lipton International Players Championships was a tennis tournament played on outdoor hard courts. It was the 4th edition of the Miami Masters and was part of the 1988 Nabisco Grand Prix and of the Category 6 tier of the 1988 WTA Tour. Both the men's and women's events took place at the Tennis Center at Crandon Park in Key Biscayne, Florida in the United States from March 14 through March 28, 1988.

Finals

Men's singles

 Mats Wilander defeated  Jimmy Connors 6–4, 4–6, 6–4, 6–4
 It was Wilander's 2nd title of the year and the 34th of his career.

Women's singles

 Steffi Graf defeated  Chris Evert 6–4, 6–4
 It was Graf's 3rd title of the year and the 22nd of her career.

Men's doubles

 John Fitzgerald /  Anders Järryd defeated  Ken Flach /  Robert Seguso 7–6, 6–1, 7–5
 It was Fitzgerald's 2nd title of the year and the 19th of his career. It was Järryd's only title of the year and the 42nd of his career.

Women's doubles

 Steffi Graf /  Gabriela Sabatini defeated  Gigi Fernández /  Zina Garrison 7–6(8–6), 6–3
 It was Graf's 3rd title of the year and the 29th of her career. It was Sabatini's 2nd title of the year and the 14th of her career. It was Graf's 3rd title at the event having won the singles event in 1987 and the singles event this year.

External links
 Official website
 ATP Tournament Profile
 WTA Tournament Profile